Major Joseph Caldewll McJunkin (1755 – 1846) was an American Revolutionary War patriot serving in the battle of Kings Mountain, North Carolina.

Joseph Caldwell McJunkin was the first son of Samuel Caldwell McJunkin and Mary Anne Bogan. Born 22 June 1755 in Carlisle, Cumberland County, Pennsylvania & died 31 May 1846 in Union County, South Carolina, he married Anne Jane Thomas 9 March 1779 in Union District, South Carolina.  She was born 15 January 1757 in Cumberland County, Pennsylvania & died 17 March 1826 in Union County, South Carolina.  He was brother of Daniel Mcjunkin.

Revolutionary War Service

In 1776, McJunkin volunteered in Col. John Thompson's Fair Forest Militia Regiment, where he engaged in the Cherokee campaign.  In May, 1777, he was made Captain and commanded at Fort Jamieson.  He served a three month guard tour in Charleston, South Carolina, from November 1779 to February 1780.  After the fall of Charleston, and the Battle of Camden, the Tory and Whig Militias engaged in guerilla war leading up to Huck's Defeat, and the Battle of King's Mountain.

He said of Captain Christian Huck:
 to punish the Presbyterian inhabitants of that place, which he did with a barbarous hand, by killing men, burning churches, & driving off the ministers of the gospel to seek shelter amongst strangers.
McJunkin was at the Battle of King's Mountain, Cedar Springs, Hanging Rock, Musgrove's Mill, Hammond's Store, Blackstock's Ford, and the Battle of Cowpens.

He was taken as a captive to Old Ninety-Six, where he was released on parole.  He then aided Gen. Nathanael Greene at the Siege of Ninety-Six.

After the war
McJunkin married Anne Jane Thomas, (daughter of Colonel John Thomas and Jane Black Thomas) settled in Union County.  In about the year 1837, he wrote his Memoirs.  Anne Thomas McJunkin died on 17 March 1826. Major Joseph Caldwell McJunkin died intestate on 31 May 1846. They are both buried in the McJunkin Cemetery, which is located about 6 miles South from the town of Union.

Works
Reverend James Hodge Saye, Memoirs of Major Joseph McJunkin - Revolutionary Patriot, Richmond Watchman and Observer, 1847

Notes

References

External links
McJunkin Family Genealogy Report
Memoirs of Major Joseph McJunkin
Sketch of Joseph McJunkin
Pension Application filed by Major Joseph McJunkin, Transcribed and Annotated by William T. Graves, Southern Campaign American Revolution Pension Statements
Battle Exhortation, Keith Yellin
McJunkin Graveyard
McJunkin Cemetery

1755 births
1846 deaths
South Carolina militiamen in the American Revolution
People from Carlisle, Pennsylvania
People from Union County, South Carolina